Grand Union Railway may refer to these train operators in the United Kingdom:

Grand Central (train operating company), name under which the company initially proposed to operated its Bradford services under
Grand Union (train operating company), proposing to operate London to Cardiff services, established in 2019